Edward George Dennett (27 April 1879 – 15 September 1937) was a left arm spinner for Gloucestershire County Cricket Club between 1903 and 1926, and from his figures could be considered one of the best bowlers never to play Test cricket. Owing to the strength of the competition at the time, Dennett was never able to progress even to lower representative levels. He failed even to be nominated as a Wisden Cricketer of the Year, though he would have been a strong candidate to be chosen in 1913. The Wisden Cricketer's Almanack picked John Wisden that year, 29 years after his death, to commemorate the 50th year of its publication.

Born on 27 April 1879, Dennett first played for Gloucestershire in 1903. In his first season, despite exceptionally helpful pitches due to a very wet summer, Dennett fared only moderately, but in 1904, he rose remarkably rapidly to one of the leading bowlers of the day. Cunning and with brilliant ability to flight the ball, Dennett was deadly when the pitch helped him but could be effective even on firm, hard pitches.

Throughout the period from 1904 to 1914, Dennett never failed to take 100 wickets for Gloucestershire. At times, they were as dependent on him as Kent were on Tich Freeman in the early 1930s, and he accomplished some amazing feats, the best of which (taking into account the state of the wicket and the batting) was his 15 wickets against Worcestershire at Cheltenham in 1906 and his taking of all 10 Essex wickets in a single innings at Bristol in the same year. In 1907, Dennett was the leading wicket-taker in all first-class matches with 201, whilst in 1913, he took 15 wickets against a very strong Surrey batting side including Jack Hobbs.

Joining the military to meet the demand for officers caused by World War I, Dennett was not released until 1920, and never really recovered his pre-war form – being helped to take 100 wickets again in 1921 by some abysmal county batting sides. In 1926, Dennett retired from the game to take up cricket coaching, though he did play three games for the county in August that year. His career of 2,147 first-class wickets puts him 23rd on the all-time list of wicket-takers. Only Glamorgan's Don Shepherd took more wickets without being capped.

An all-round sportsman, he also excelled at soccer, fives, billiards and shooting. In retirement, his health soon deteriorated. He died at Leckhampton, Gloucestershire on 15 September 1937.

References

English cricketers
Gloucestershire cricketers
1879 births
1937 deaths
Sportspeople from Cheltenham
Marylebone Cricket Club cricketers
Players cricketers
North v South cricketers
West of England cricketers
Non-international England cricketers
Cricketers who have taken ten wickets in an innings
Players of the South cricketers
British Army personnel of World War I
British Army officers
Military personnel from Dorset